Count Basie at Newport is a live album by jazz musician Count Basie and his orchestra. It was originally issued as Verve MGV 8243 and included only the tracks 1-7 and 13. Tracks 9-12 originally included in Count Basie & Joe Williams/Dizzy Gillespie & Mary Lou Williams at Newport (Verve MGV 8244).

Reception

The AllMusic review by Scott Yanow awarded the album five stars and said that "At the 1957 Newport Jazz Festival, the music was consistently inspired and often historic. Count Basie welcomed back tenor great Lester Young and singer Jimmy Rushing for part of a very memorable set...Young plays beautifully throughout and Rushing is in prime form. An exciting full-length version of "One O'Clock Jump" features Young, Illinois Jacquet, and trumpeter Roy Eldridge...It's a great set of music".

Track listing
Introduction by John H. Hammond – 4:52
"Swingin' at the Newport" (Ernie Wilkins) – 8:30
"Polka Dots and Moonbeams" (Johnny Burke, Jimmy Van Heusen) – 3:33
"Lester Leaps In" (Lester Young) – 3:02
"Sent for You Yesterday and Here You Come Today" (Count Basie, Eddie Durham, Jimmy Rushing) – 4:04
"Boogie Woogie (I May Be Wrong)" (Basie, Rushing) – 3:49
"Evenin'" (Charles Daniels, Mitchell Parish, Harry White, Richard Whiting) – 3:32
"Blee Blop Blues" (Basie, Ahmad Kharab Salim) – 3:32 (this track was originally released on Verve MG VS-6025, Verve MGV-8244; bonus track on CD reissue)
"Alright, Okay, You Win" (Mayme Watts, Sid Wyche) – 2:45 (this track was originally released on Verve MG VS-6025, Verve MGV-8244; bonus track on CD reissue)
"The Comeback" (Charles Frazier, Memphis Slim) – 4:10 (this track was originally released on Verve MG VS-6025, Verve MGV-8244; bonus track on CD reissue)
"Roll 'Em Pete" (Pete Johnson, Joe Turner) – 3:00 (this track was originally released on Verve MG VS-6025, Verve MGV-8244; bonus track on CD reissue)
"Smack Dab in the Middle" (Eddie Calhoun) – 3:44 (this track was originally released on Verve MG VS-6025, Verve MGV-8244; bonus track on CD reissue)
"One O'Clock Jump" (Basie) – 9:26

Personnel
Count Basie - piano
The Count Basie Orchestra
Wendell Culley - trumpet
Roy Eldridge - trumpet
Reunald Jones - trumpet
Thad Jones - trumpet
Joe Newman - trumpet
Henry Coker - trombone
Bill Hughes - trombone
Benny Powell - trombone
Bill Graham - alto saxophone
Marshal Royal - alto saxophone, clarinet
Frank Foster - tenor saxophone
Illinois Jacquet - tenor saxophone (track 13)
Lester Young - tenor saxophone (tracks 3–7, 13)
Frank Wess - tenor Saxophone, flute
Charlie Fowlkes - baritone saxophone
Freddie Green - guitar
Eddie Jones - bass
Jo Jones - drums (tracks 3–7, 13)
Sonny Payne - drums (tracks 2, 8–12)
Jimmy Rushing - vocals (5-7)
Joe Williams - vocals (9-12)

See also
1957 in music

References

Count Basie Orchestra live albums
Albums recorded at the Newport Jazz Festival
Albums produced by Norman Granz
1957 live albums
1957 in Rhode Island
Verve Records live albums